Upright is an Australian comedy drama series created by Chris Taylor that premiered on 28 November, 2019 on Sky Atlantic in the United Kingdom, and on 1 December, 2019 on Fox Showcase in Australia. The series stars Tim Minchin and Milly Alcock in the lead roles, with Minchin also writing and composing. The series was later broadcast on Super Channel in Canada and on SundanceNow in the USA.

In October 2021, the series was renewed for a second season, which premiered in its entirety on November 15, 2022 on Fox Showcase in Australia and moved to Sky Comedy in the UK.

Premise 
The first season follows the journey of Lucky, a struggling musician, and Meg, a runaway teenager who, after literally crashing into each other's lives, attempt to transport an upright piano across the southern Australian Outback to Lucky's terminally ill mother in his hometown of Perth.

The second season takes place four years later, where Lucky, now a successful musician, and Meg, who is two months pregnant, reunite and embark on a mission to find Meg's missing mum in the rainforests of northern Queensland.

Cast and characters

Main 
 Tim Minchin as Laclan "Lucky" Flynn
 Milly Alcock as Megan "Meg" Adams

Recurring 
 Heather Mitchell as Jen Flynn (season 1; guest season 2)
 Daniel Lapaine as Toby Flynn
 Ella Scott Lynch as Suzie Flynn (season 1; guest season 2)
 Daniel Frederiksen as Andy Adams
 Asmara Feik as Billie Flynn
 Jessica McNamee as Avery Mae (season 2)
 Hayley McElhinney as Linda Adams / Willow (season 2)
 Travis Cotton as Duncan (season 2)
 Nicholas Brown as Chubba / The Father (season 2)
 Oskar Houghton as Barley (season 2)

Guest 
 Season one 
 Sachin Joab as Dr. Kashani
 Jai Koutrae as Spider
 Luke Carroll as Constable Brett
 Rebecca Massey as Constable Stacey
 Laura Brent as Elise
Alex Chard as Will
 Ningali Lawford as Danni
 Felino Dolloso as Joey Mabilisa
 Joshua Orpin as Matty Adams
 Sue Jones as Bev
 Neil Melville as Jim
 Kate Box as Esme
 Rob Collins as Kane

 Season two 
 Christopher Sommers as Snapper
 Anthony Brandon Wong as Richard Hodgkinson
 Elena Carapetis as Nina
 Dimitrius Schuster-Koloamatangi as Jaxon
 Hazel Phillips as Val
 Jeanette Cronin as Barb
 Darren Gilshenan as Barney
 Tom Budge as Geert
 Noni Hazlehurst as Squirrel
 Lawrence Ola as Quiet Collin
 Hollie Andrew as Bec
 Anita Hegh as Chrysanthe
 Queenie van de Zandt as Tammy / Sage

Episodes

Season 1 (2019)

Season 2 (2022)

Production 
Lake Bumbunga in South Australia was used as a filming location for some scenes, with over 50 cast members performing in the pink lake at the same time.

Reception 
"The whole thing is both quintessentially Australian and deliciously unexpected," wrote Melinda Houston for The Sydney Morning Herald when the show originally aired, adding "great to see another show making creative use of our landscapes: the dry interior is blasted one moment, enchanted the next." Decider wrote "Minchin and Alcock make a good road trip pair, and that’s pretty much what Upright is all about," and gave it a "stream it" verdict. In Luke Buckmaster's review for The Guardian, he characterizes the two leads: "Minchin’s performance combines stoner-like man-child and emotionally stunted adult with a splash of shaggy panache all his own, evolving his character from sad-sack weirdo to a reasonably complex person. Alcock is excellent as the other half of the odd couple: with a head-turning, hair-trigger performance that delivers the show an almost electrical energy."

References

External links 
 

Showcase (Australian TV channel) original programming
Sky Atlantic original programming
Australian comedy television series
2019 Australian television series debuts
2010s Australian television series
2020s Australian television series
Television shows set in the Outback